Love Ain't Gonna Wait for Us is a studio album by American country artist Billie Jo Spears. It was released in October 1978 via United Artists Records and contained ten tracks. The disc featured mostly new recordings, along with several cover tunes. It featured a country pop production, overseen by Larry Butler. Two singles were spawned from the album: the title track and a cover of "Yesterday". It received a positive reception from Cashbox magazine.

Background and recording
Billie Jo Spears reached her career zenith while recording for United Artists Records in the 1970s. She topped the country charts with "Blanket on the Ground" and reached the top ten with "What I've Got in Mind", "Misty Blue" and "If You Want Me". A series of other singles also reached the top 20 like "'57 Chevrolet" and "Lonely Hearts Club". A series of albums were also issued by her label, including 1978's Love Ain't Gonna Wait for Us. The project was recorded at the Jack Clement Recording Studio in Nashville, Tennessee. Sessions were produced by Larry Butler and were held in August 1978.

Content
Love Ain't Gonna Wait for Us was a collection of ten tracks. Several original songs were featured on the project, including the title track and "Standing Tall". Both were co-written by Larry Butler and Ben Peters. A new version of "Standing Tall" would be released as a single by Spears in 1980 and reach the country's top 20. It also featured two new recordings by Jerry Foster and Bill Rice: "Let's Make It You and Me in Love Again", "For the First Time in My Life" and "Why Did You Have to Be So Good". The latter would later be recorded by Dave & Sugar in 1979. Another cover was The Beatles's "Yesterday". Another track, "Slow Movin' Outlaw", was first recorded by Waylon Jennings for his 1974 album This Time.

Release, chart performance, singles and reception
Love Ain't Gonna Wait for Us was released by United Artists Records in October 1978. The label distributed the disc as both a vinyl LP and a cassette. Cashbox magazine gave the album a positive reception in their December 1979 issue. "Lush production only adds to Spears' sensitive vocals. Best songs are 'Slow Movin' Outlaw,' 'For the First Time In My Life' and 'Love Ain't Gonna Wait For Us', they concluded. Two singles were spawned from the album. The first was the title track, also issued in October 1978. It reached number 24 on the American Billboard Hot Country Songs chart and number 47 on the Canadian RPM Country Tracks chart. In January 1979, "Yesterday" was spawned as the project's second single. It reached number 60 on the Billboard country chart and number 35 on the RPM country chart.

Track listing

Personnel
All credits are adapted from the liner notes of Love Ain't Gonna Wait for Us.

Musical personnel
Tommy Allsup – Bass guitar
Byron Bach – Strings
Brenton Banks – Strings
George Binkley III – Strings
Marvin Chantry – Strings
Steve Chapman – Guitar
Stanley Chase – Drums
Roy Christensen – Strings
Ray Edenton – Guitar
Paul Franklin – Steel guitar
Carl Gorodetzky – Strings
Lonnie Haight – Strings
The Jordanaires – Background vocals

Sheldon Kurland – Strings
Larry Lee McFadden – Background vocals
Bob Moore – Bass
Ron Oates – Keyboards
Jerry Reid – Background vocals, guitar
Hargus "Pig" Robbins – Keyboards
Billy Sanford – Guitar
Jerry Shook – Guitar
Steven Smith – Strings
Billie Jo Spears – Lead vocals
Gary Vanosdale – Strings
Pamela Vanosdale – Strings

Technical personnel
Larry Butler – Producer
Bill Burks – Design
Tom Gibbons – Photography
Bill Justis – String arrangement
Billy Sherrill – Engineer
Bob Sowell – Mastering

Release history

References

1979 albums
Albums arranged by Bill Justis
Albums produced by Larry Butler (producer)
Billie Jo Spears albums
United Artists Records albums